Tiger was launched in America in 1813 and apparently captured on her maiden voyage. Captain Lewellyn purchased her in prize and initially she sailed between England and the Mediterranean. Under new ownership in the early-1820s, she started trading with New South Wales and India under a license from the British East India Company (EIC). She is last listed in 1833.

Origins
Tiger apparently was launched in America in 1813. On 10 March 1813 Medusa captured the American vessel Messenger, and on 22 March the American vessel Tiger. It is highly likely that this Tiger was the Tiger condemned in the prize court on 4 May 1813 and sold to Llewellyn & Co.

Career
Initially Tiger traded between England and the Mediterranean.

In February 1817 Lloyd's List reported that Tiger, Llewellyn, master, had run onshore near Gravesend while on her way to Smyrna and Constantinople. It was expected that she would have to put back to repair. Tiger, Powell, master, put into Northfleet Dock on 25 February to repair.

From around 1821 Tiger started trading with India and Australia. Tiger, Brash, master, left England  on October 1821 for Van Diemen's Land {VDL), and arrived at Hobart Town on 22 January 1822, having sailed via the Cape of Good Hope. She then sailed to Port Jackson, returning to Hobart Town on 20 April. She sailed for England on 26 May with colonial produce and 4000 bushels of wheat for Cape Town.

On 18 March 1825 Captain Kent sailed from England for Ceylon.

Lloyd's Register reported that on 9 August 1826 Captain R. Brash sailed from England for Van Diemen's Land and New South Wales. However, newspapers from Hobart Town, Van Diemen's Land, report that Tiger, Captain Thomas Richards left England on 14 December and arrived 13 April 1827 at Hobart Town. Tiger carried a wide variety of goods consigned to merchants there. Captain Richards left Hobart-Town on 4 May for Port Jackson. After she arrived at Port Jackson, she was taken up for a voyage to Calcutta.

On 11 June 1828 Tiger, Captain Richards, was at Concepción, Chile. Also in port was the brig Indefatigable, ex–. On 18 August Tiger was at Tahiti where she was able to assist four men from Indefatigable who had arrived there by open boat, having been put in the boat after the Chilean crew members had mutinied on 21 July, killed Captain James Duncan, and taken her. The mutineers had retained the chief mate, Mr. Lossgreen, to navigate for them. Tiger brought the crew members she had rescued to Port Jackson around 24 September.

Tiger was carrying a cargo of wheat, tobacco, and horses. On her way to Sydney, as she neared the Australian coast, she had encountered a severe gale that damaged her spars and rigging. Two passengers on board, William Lowe and James Marshall, did such good work in assisting in the repairs to Tiger that Captain Richards refunded them their passage money. Lowe and Marshall later established a ship-building partnership.

Notes

Citations

References
 

1813 ships
Captured ships
Age of Sail merchant ships of England